The Samsung Continuum (i400) is an Android device produced by Samsung Electronics in 2010. It included a unique feature of a bottom "ticker" display that allowed for notifications and multitasking. Some people consider the successor to this device to be the Galaxy Note Edge which also included the unique second portion of screen for notifications and multitasking.

References

Continuum
Continuum
Mobile phones introduced in 2010